The stripe-backed bittern (Ixobrychus involucris) is a species of heron in the family Ardeidae which is found in South America and Trinidad.

Description

It is darker brown with a white and brown striped pattern along the back, and a black stripe from head to tail, while the underbelly is lighter brown and striped with white. This bittern calls through distinct, low-pitched , or through gargling.

Distribution and habitat
The stripe-backed bittern is distributed in large patches across South America, located in Colombia, Venezuela, Guyana, Suriname, French Guiana and the island of Trinidad to the north, and in Paraguay, Uruguay, Argentina, Chile and Brazil to the south, inhabiting reed-beds and sedge.

Behaviour and ecology
The stripe-backed bittern is a solitary animal. It generally feeds at night on small fish, crustaceans and insects such as dragonflies and water beetles. It is not a strong flier, and only does so across short distances. When threatened, it responds by pointing its neck and bill skyward, a characteristic posture of bitterns.

The stripe-backed bittern makes small nests of reeds and stems, which are found above water level, among reeds. The clutch consists of three eggs. Incubation period for eggs is unknown, and breeding seasons appear to vary based on location.

Status
This bittern is considered to be of least concern due to its wide range, and large, stable population.

References 

stripe-backed bittern
Birds of South America
Birds of Trinidad and Tobago
Birds of the Caribbean
stripe-backed bittern
Taxa named by Louis Jean Pierre Vieillot
Taxonomy articles created by Polbot